Tirupati revenue division is an administrative division in the Tirupati district of the Indian state of Andhra Pradesh. It is one of the 3 revenue divisions in the district with 9 mandals under its administration. Tirupati serves as the headquarters of the division. The division has 1 municipalities and 1 municipal corporation.

History 

The revenue division was originally a part of Chittoor district and was made part of the newly formed Tirupati district on 4 April 2022.

Administration 
The details of the mandals and urban settlements in the division are:

See also 
List of revenue divisions in Andhra Pradesh
List of mandals in Andhra Pradesh
Tirupati district
Sullurupeta revenue division
Srikalahasti revenue division
Gudur revenue division

References

External links 

Revenue divisions in Andhra Pradesh